Unión Department is a  department of Córdoba Province in Argentina.

The provincial subdivision has a population of about 100,247 inhabitants in an area of 11,182 km², and its capital city is Bell Ville, which is located around 513 km from the Capital federal.

Settlements
Aldea Santa María
Alto Alegre
Ana Zumarán
Ballesteros
Ballesteros Sud
Bell Ville
Gould
Canals
Chilibroste
Cintra
Colonia Bismarck
Colonia Bremen
Idiazábal
Justiniano Posse
Laborde
Monte Leña
Monte Maíz
Morrison
Noetinger
Ordóñez
Pascanas
Pueblo Italiano
San Antonio de Litín
San Marcos Sud
Viamonte
Villa Los Patos
Wenceslao Escalante

Departments of Córdoba Province, Argentina